

The Blanchard Brd.1 was a French reconnaissance flying boat, to the 1923 STAé HB.3 specification, used by the French navy in the 1920s. It was a large biplane with two engines mounted in the gap between the wings, each engine driving a pusher propeller.  In 1924, one Brd.1 was used to set several world altitude records for seaplanes.

Operators

French Navy

Units using this aircraft
Aéronautique Maritime
 Escadrille 5R1

Specifications

See also

References

Further reading
 

Blanchard aircraft
1920s French military reconnaissance aircraft
Flying boats
Twin-engined pusher aircraft
Biplanes
Aircraft first flown in 1922